Michelle Coleman (born 31 October 1993) is a Swedish competitive swimmer specialized in the sprint freestyle and backstroke events. She is the current Swedish national record holder in the 100 meter backstroke (short course), and the 200 meter backstroke (long course and short course). She finished 7th in the 200 meter freestyle at the 2016 Olympic Games in Rio and led off the Swedish silver medal winning 4 × 100 m medley relay team at the 2015 World Championships in Kazan.

Career
At the 2012 Summer Olympics, she competed for the national team in the Women's 4 x 100 metre freestyle relay, but they were disqualified in the final.

At the 2013 European Short Course Swimming Championships won the bronze medal for the first time on 14 December.

Coleman raced at the Rio 2016 Summer Olympics and reached the finals for 200 m freestyle, finishing 7th.

In November 2016 it was announced that Michelle Coleman and fellow Swedish swimmer Jennie Johansson were barred from competing in international events representing Sweden, for disciplinary reasons. The ban was lifted after 2016 and she was able to start racing again in 2017.

In March 2017 Michelle Coleman went to Australia to compete in the 2017 New South Wales Open Championships. She won the 200 m freestyle event with a time of 1:55.98. In April 2017 Coleman competed in the Stockholm Swim Open and won the 200 m freestyle event with a time of 1:58.02. She also won the 100 m backstroke event with a time of 1:00.28 ahead of Katinka Hosszú. In the 200 m freestyle even, she won the first place with a time of 1:55.64, which was a world-leading time in 2016-17 season.

Personal bests
(Last updated on 25 May 2021)

Long course (50 m)

Short course (25 m)

References

Swedish female backstroke swimmers
1993 births
Living people
Olympic swimmers of Sweden
Swimmers at the 2012 Summer Olympics
Swimmers at the 2016 Summer Olympics
Swimmers at the 2020 Summer Olympics
Swedish female freestyle swimmers
European Aquatics Championships medalists in swimming
Täby Sim swimmers
Spårvägens SF swimmers
World Aquatics Championships medalists in swimming
Medalists at the FINA World Swimming Championships (25 m)
People from Vallentuna Municipality
Sportspeople from Stockholm County
21st-century Swedish women